The Österreichische Basketball Bundesliga (ÖBL) Most Valuable Player is an award given to the best player in the Österreichische Basketball Bundesliga, the highest professional basketball league in Austria.

Winners

Awards won by nationality

Awards won by club

References

Basketball most valuable player awards
European basketball awards
Most Valuable Player